Cinco Ribeiras is a civil parish in the municipality of Angra do Heroísmo on the island of Terceira in the Portuguese archipelago of the Azores. The population in 2011 was 704, in an area of 12.80 km².

Geography

Physical geography
The parish of Cinco Ribeiras is situated on the southwest coast of the island of Terceira, occupying a roughly triangler swath from the coast to the summit of the volcano of Santa Bárbara in the island's interior. It is bordered on the east by the civil parish of São Bartolomeu de Regatos and west by the parish of Santa Bárbara das Nove Ribeiras, as well as, along a short frontier to the north, with the parish of Altares.

Yet, running through the region are several smaller volcanic cones composed of black or red basaltic rock. The lower part of the parish developed along a planar zone that corresponds with the terminal area of basaltic fissural flows from the region of Pico da Bagacina, resulting in a gently sloping area towards the northwest. This area is occupied by relatively recent lava flows, with little evidence of pyroclastic eruptive material, translating into shallow soils and rocky covering.

Towards the west and interior, the slope gradually increases, passing into a transition zone towards the cone of the Serra de Santa Bárbara. The highest part of the parish, the apex of the administrative frontier corresponds to the watercourses that divide the ravines of Praia da Vitória and Cinco Ribeiras, an area of accentuated slopes, reaching the summit of the caldera of Santa Bárbara (the highest point on the island of Terceira).

Cinco Ribeiras is crossed by three primary ravines: the Ribeira do Mouro, the Ribeira das Cinco and the Ribeira da Praia, that are part of the radial drainage system, of the Santa Bárbara Massif.

Climate
Situated along the southwest of the Serra de Santa Bárbara, the parish occupies a transition zone between oceanic and Mediterranean climate (on the Köppen-Geiger classification between Csb, on the lower areas, and Cfb, on higher altitudes), exposed to strong southwest winds, resulting in elevated humidity during periods of atmospheric instability, intense orthographic precipitation in the higher altitudes. Precipitation along the massif results in flooding along the shallow ravines, which are unable to transport the water that flows from the higher altitudes.

Human geography

Urban development, much like the other settlements of Terceira, is constituted by a linear structure, that follows the main roadway that circles the island, with little expansion into the fields.

Another nucleus in development, constituted by primarily summer homes, developed around the porto of Cinco Ribeiras, circling the small hermitage of Nossa Senhora de Lurdes, in addition to a few homes in the Canada do Porto alongside.

Following the 1991 census the parish included 650 inhabitants (138 males and 114 female residents), included in the localities referred to as Ribeira das Cinco (51 inhabitants), Ribeira do Mouro (84 inhabitants) and Cinco Ribeiras (418 inhabitants). The population decreased during the 20th century, from its apex of 1180 residents around 1900.

The evolution of the parish has been marked by emigration, primarily to Brasil, then the United States and finally to Canada. During the 20th century, the population maintained stable until the middle of the 1960s; then, following facilitated emigration laws and the consequence of the Kennedy-Pastore Act, the population began a rapid decline until it stabilized following the Carnation Revolution.

Architecture
The traditional architecture of Cinco Ribeiras resembles much of the rural homes of the western Terceira region, and is generally constructed around a single floor. The settlement is also distinguished for its many white-washed homes, bordered by multi-coloured trim around the corners, doors and windows (unique for the island of Terceira).
 Church of Nossa Senhora do Pilar
 Império of Holy Spirit of Cinco Ribeiras

References
Notes

Freguesias of Angra do Heroísmo